Bandanaya, is a 2017 Sri Lankan Sinhala horror film directed and produced by Udayakantha Warnasuriya. Musical score was done by Nadun Rathnayake. It stars Cyril Wickramage, Hemal Ranasinghe, Dulani Anuradha in lead roles along with Suvineetha Weerasinghe, Nilmini Tennakoon and Ravindra Yasas. The film was released in 50 CEL circuit cinemas in addition to 12 cinemas which screen the movie in 3D format. It is noted for being presented in black-and-white monochrome.

The film trailer was released in October 2016. The opening screening was held in Regal Theatre, Colombo. It is the 1273rd Sri Lankan film in the Sinhala cinema.

Plot
In 1932, A rural village falls under the control of Mahasona Yaka. The tantric of the village, Menik hami who practice esoteric ritualism takes advantages of this to gain a land which is the reason of hatred two brothers. He uses his brother's granddaughter who was bitten by a snake to make a deal with devil.

Cast
 Cyril Wickramage as Menik Hami
 Saheli Sadithma as Sumana
 Hemal Ranasinghe as Jayasoma
 Dulani Anuradha as Piyasili
 Sudam Katukithula as Gemunu
 Suvineetha Weerasinghe as Selestina
 Nilmini Tennakoon as Nandawathi
 Leonie Kotelawala as Alis Nona
 Ravindra Yasas as Wimalasiri
 Priyankara Rathnayake as Ariyapala
 Wilman Sirimanna as Dingi Rala
 Ariyasena Gamage
 Ranjith Silva as Devil
 Kumara Wadurassa as Baker
 Udaya Kumari as Dead woman
 Nethalie Nanayakkara as Piyasili's granny
 Ranjith Rubasinghe

References

External links
 
උදයකාන්ත වර්ණසූරියගේ 21 වැනි චිත්‍රපටය
බන්ධනයට ඉහළ ප්‍රතිචාර
තව සීන් එකක් තිබුණා නම් බන්ධනය මරු
වැඩිහිටියන්ට වඩා සුදුසු වුණේ භීතිය නිසයි
මගේ පළමු ලිපියත් පළමු සම්මානයත් සරසවියෙන්

2017 films
2017 horror films
2010s Sinhala-language films
Sri Lankan horror films
Films directed by Udayakantha Warnasuriya